The Miner's Right is an 1891 play by Alfred Dampier and Garnet Walch based on a story by Rolf Boldrewood. It was highly successful and one of the most popular Australian plays of the 1890s.

References

External links
The Miner's Right at AustLit
The Miner's Right at AusStage

Australian plays
1891 plays